Sir Albert Louis (Lou) Bussau (9 July 18845 May 1947) was a farmer, a Victorian politician and the Victoiran Agent General in London.

Early years

Bussau was born in Natimuk to carpenter and farmer Johann Joachim Heinrich Adolph Bussau and Maria Ernestina, nee Rokesky. He attended Warracknabeal state school until he was 12 years old when he left to work for his father. With his mothers encouragement studied at night school and then Law by correspondence with the University of Melbourne, becoming an articled clerk. He was employed by a legal firm, J.S.Wright-Smith, attending to business in the Warracknabeal, Beulah and Hopetoun district, travelling by bicycle to visit clients.  He was later commissioned to open an office for J. S. Wright-Smith in Hopetoun. He read extensively, attended Labor Party meetings and was a lay-preacher in the Baptist Church
On 22 April 1912 he married schoolteacher Mary Scott Baird, a Ballarat teacher. They had no children.

In 1915, after a terrible drought, he bought 640 acres of land (259 hectares) north of Hopetoun to grow wheat and raise fat lambs, later extending the farm in partnership with share farmers.

Politics
In 1916 Bussau supported Percy Stewart and the radical Victorian Farmers Union in support of farming issues.

Bussau’s interest in representative politics found local expression when he was elected to the Karkarooc Shire Council. He served was a councillor from 1921 to 1932 and was president from 1926 to 1927. In 1927 he was a founding member of the Victorian Wheatgrowers’ Association (VWA) and an organiser.  In 1933 he the VWA president 1933. and the president of the Country Progressive Party in 1929. From 1931 to 1932 he was vice-president of the United Country Party.

In 1932 he was elected to the Victorian Legislative Assembly for Ouyen electorate representing the United Country Party. He was Transport Minister for a time, Attorney-General and Solicitor-General in the government of Albert Dunstan between 2 April 1935, and 1 April 1938. Bussau resigned to become Agent-General for Victoria in London from 1938 - 40.[3] In 1938 he visited Germany and observed their brown coal mines. During the blitz of London he was actively engaged in Fire Watch duties and was nicknamed as ‘the Mad Australian” for the daring he showed in this role.

Australian Natives'Association

Bussau was a member of Hopetoun Australian Natives' Association ANA Branch No. 43 when he was elected to the ANA Board at the 1919 Annual Conference. He was elected Chief President at Bairnsdale Annual Conference in 1923.  He retired from the Board in 1933.  He was a vigorous forthright speaker.

Later years

In recognition of Fire Watch and other activities in London he was Knighted in 1941.  Although he received the Knighthood, he always preferred to be addressed as “Lou”.

He returned from London to via the US wheat belt to Victoria to the role of Air Raid Precautions adviser in 1943 based on his experience with Fire Bombing in England. He became inaugural chairman of the Australian Wheat Board in 1945.

Bussau died at South Yarra in 1947.

References

 

1884 births
1947 deaths
National Party of Australia members of the Parliament of Victoria
Members of the Victorian Legislative Assembly
Attorneys-General of Victoria
Solicitors-General of Victoria
Australian Knights Bachelor
20th-century Australian politicians